Katja Terlau (born 29 April 1970 in Münster) is a German art historian and provenance researcher. She was a co-initiator and founding member of the international  in Germany, founded in 2000 and is considered a pioneer of German , which she entered after the Washington Principles on Nazi-Confiscated Art of 1998. Her main subject area is looted art; a number of museum holdings and large Jewish collections have been processed by her.

Career 
Terlau studied art history, history of archaeology and prehistory and early history at University of Münster and University of Cologne. There she completed her Master's degree in art history and archaeology in 1995. In 1998 she received her doctorate from the University of Cologne with a dissertation entitled Die Hl. Kreuzkirche in Stromberg und ihre Stellung innerhalb der westfälischen Hallenkirchen. After working as a museum assistant at the Cologne Wallraf-Richartz-Museum from 1999 to 2000, she conducted research until 2003 as part of a project funded by the Sal. Oppenheim Foundation, she researched the provenances of all works of art acquired for the Wallraf-Richartz-Museum between 1933 and 1945. In 2001, in this context, she organised the internationale academic seminar Museen im Zwielicht – Ankaufspolitik 1933–1945 in Cologne.

Since 2003, Terlau has worked as a freelance art historian with provenance research and consultations for museums, foundations, private collections and the media. In this context, for example, in 2003/2004 she provided scientific advice for the film Das Erbe der Väter - wie der Otto Wolff arisch wurde in the WDR series . For the heirs of the art dealer Jacques Goudstikker, who had to flee Germany as a Jew in 1940, she and Clemens Toussaint's team located numerous objects in the collection and achieved their partial return.

In 2013, on behalf of the Research Centre for Degenerate Art at the Free University of Berlin, she examined the paintings and graphic works in the art collections of the city of Düsseldorf in order to identify the objects confiscated by the National Socialists in 1937.

From 2011 to 2013, together with Anja Heuß, she acted as spokesperson for the Provenance Research Working Group (Arbeitskreis Provenienzforschung e.V.), which she co-founded. In addition, she has been the initiator and moderator of the Provenance Research Working Group NRW since 2013. She was also a member of the advisory board of the Magdeburg Coordination Office at the German Centre for the Loss of Cultural Property from 2012 to 2014.

Since the summer semester of 2015, Terlau has been a lecturer at the Art History Institute of the University of Cologne.

In 2018, she temporarily joined forces with Vanessa Voigt to form the art historical consultancy firm Terlau & Voigt. The company was dissolved in autumn 2020; Since then, Terlau has returned to work as a freelance provenance researcher.

Publications 
 Monographs
 
 

 Articles

References

External links 
 
 

German art historians
Women art historians
University of Cologne alumni
Academic staff of the University of Cologne
1970 births
Living people
People from Münster